A spring-tooth harrow, sometimes called a drag harrow, is a type of harrow, and specifically a type of tine harrow. It is a largely outdated piece of farm equipment. It uses many flexible iron teeth mounted in rows to loosen the soil before planting. It is set in the ground and raised manually and cannot be backed up; this is why it has been replaced by more modern equipment such as the chisel plow and field cultivator.

A drag harrow more specifically refers to a largely outdated type of soil cultivation implement that is used to smooth the ground as well as loosen it after it has been plowed and packed.  It uses many flexible iron teeth usually arranged into three rows.  It has no hydraulic functionality and has to be raised/adjusted with one or multiple manual levers.  It is a largely outdated piece of farm equipment, having been replaced by more modern disc harrows and deeper, stiff-toothed rippers, however, smaller farmers still use them.

Uses

A drag harrow is used to loosen and even out soil after it has been plowed and packed.  The drag harrow also kills some weeds that may be present, but it is not very efficient in doing so, and it is not one of its primary functions.

In modern times

The non-hydraulic drag harrow is not often used in modern farming as other harrows have proven to be more suitable, such as the disc harrow. Another reason they are not often used is because they cannot be controlled hydraulically, meaning that the operator is required to dismount from the tractor to adjust it or unclog it.  However it is used as a drag behind several other implements such as a rod weeder. Due to their low cost and simplicity, old fashioned are still widely used by small farmers.

See also 

Drag harrows can be a name used for several different types of equipment. A spike tooth harrow or flex harrow is often called a drag harrow and is in use extensively throughout the US for seedbed preparation and for grooming grassland pastures. See also:

Spike harrow

References

External links

Agricultural machinery